The posthumous discography of American singer Patsy Cline consists of recordings released after March 5, 1963. Since her death, Cline's record label and other labels have released numerous studio albums, compilation albums and singles. Decca Records (Cline's label at the time of her death) planned to release Cline's fourth studio album at the time of her death. Instead, a compilation was released in June 1963 titled The Patsy Cline Story. The album reached number 9 on the Billboard country albums list and number 74 on the pop albums chart. Two singles posthumously released in 1963 became top 10 hits on the Billboard country songs chart: "Sweet Dreams (Of You)" and "Faded Love". Following the release of two posthumous studio albums, Decca issued Patsy Cline's Greatest Hits in 1967. It was the highest-selling female country album for 28 years until Shania Twain surpassed her record in 1995. Greatest Hits was reissued multiple times and eventually was certified diamond in sales in the United States.

In 1980, MCA Records released versions of Cline's music with new backing tracks overdubbed onto the original vocals. This included a single, "Always", and a posthumous studio album of overdubbed material. Overdubbed duets were also released between Cline and deceased artist Jim Reeves. These duets appeared on albums, including Remembering Patsy Cline & Jim Reeves (1982). Singles between the artists were also issued, including "Have You Ever Been Lonely?". The song reached number 5 on the Billboard country songs chart. along with a similarly constructed digital duet, I Fall to Pieces which appeared on the RCA compilation album Greatest Hits of Jim Reeves & Patsy Cline along with solo hits by the two artists.

In 1985, Cline's film biopic, Sweet Dreams was released, spawning a soundtrack of the same name. The soundtrack certified gold in the United States. Cline's original vocals were again overdubbed with new backing tracks for the recording. The movie brought renewed interest to her recordings, sparking labels to reissue and re-release material This included 1985's Heartaches (which certified platinum), Songwriter's Tribute (1986), The Last Sessions (1988), and Faded Love (1988). MCA also released an album of live material recorded at the Grand Ole Opry called Live at the Opry. The label also released her first box set, The Patsy Cline Collection (1991). It certified platinum and peaked at number 29 on the Billboard country albums chart.<ref>{{cite magazine |title=The Patsy Cline Collection': Chart history: Country Albums |url=https://www.billboard.com/artist/patsy-cline/chart-history/clp/ |magazine=Billboard |accessdate=7 November 2019}}</ref>

In 1990, Cline's two previous hit singles ("I Fall to Pieces" and "Crazy") became hits in the United Kingdom. The 1995 compilation Patsy Cline Sings Songs of Love sold one million records in the United States. In 1999, Mercury Records released Patsy Cline Duets, Volume 1, which peaked at number 67 on the Top Country Albums chart. Its first single, a duet with John Berry reached a minor position on the Billboard country chart. Additionally, 2005's Patsy Cline Gold reached number 43  while 2008's Collector's Edition reached number 71 on the Billboard country albums list. Among her recent releases was 2012's Icon'' which peaked at number 38 on the country albums chart. Patsy Cline has sold 15 million records posthumously according to the Recording Industry Association of America.

Studio albums

Compilation albums

1960s–1980s

1990s–2010s

Other albums

Soundtracks

Box sets

Live albums

Singles

Other charted songs

Videography

Video albums

Music videos

Other appearances

See also 
 Patsy Cline discography

Notes

References

External links
 The Patsy Cline Discography by George Hewitt

Cline, Patsy posthumous
Discographies of American artists
Albums published posthumously
Songs released posthumously